Parotocinclus eppleyi is a fish in the family Loricariidae native to South America. It is found swimming in the upper and middle portions of the Rio Orinoco.

The fish is named in honor of Capt. Marion Eppley (1883–1960), the founder of the Eppley Foundation for Research in New York, for its financial support of the authors’ 1989–1991 collecting efforts in Venezuela, which led to the discovery of this species.

References

Schaefer, S.A. and F. Provenzano, 1993. The Guyana Shield Parotocinclus: systematic, biogeography, and description of a new Venezuelan species (Siluroidei: Loricariidae). Ichthyol. Explor. Freshwat. 4(1):39–56. 

Otothyrinae
Freshwater fish of Brazil
Taxa named by Scott Allen Schaefer
Taxa named by Francisco Provenzano-Rizzi
Fish described in 1993